Đak Pơ is a district (huyện) of Gia Lai province in the Central Highlands region of Vietnam.

As of 2003 the district had a population of 35,258. The district covers an area of 500 km². The district capital lies at Đak Pơ.

References

Districts of Gia Lai province